SCDS may refer to:

 Superior canal dehiscence syndrome, a medical condition of the inner ear leading to hearing and balance disorders
  Sequential compression devices
 Sacramento Country Day School
 Savannah Country Day School
 Seattle Country Day School
 SimCity DS - a simulation/city building computer game
 Sonoma Country Day School